Zoo Băneasa is a zoo in Bucharest, Romania, located in a northern district of the city, called Băneasa. The park was founded in 1955 as a service of the Municipal Household Section of the People's Council of the Capital.

At that time, small livestock were spread in the parks of Cișmigiu, Carol I, and Herăstrău, and in Băneasa Forest.

Between the years 1955-1959 there was a progressive concentration of animals in the Băneasa Zoological Corner, where on 1 May 1959 the first visiting season was opened.

In 1962, the title of the institution became the Bucharest Zoo and in the same year it was included in the International Yearbook of Zoological Gardens (International Zoo Yearbook, edited by the Society of Zoology from London).

References 

Zoos in Romania
Buildings and structures in Bucharest
Tourist attractions in Bucharest
Articles needing infobox zoo
Băneasa